BUCS Super Rugby is the highest level of men's university rugby in Britain and a potential pathway for university players into elite rugby. It comprises ten teams from universities in England and Wales. The league is named for its governing body, British Universities and Colleges Sport (BUCS).

History
BUCS Super Rugby was launched in 2016 as a new, top level of university rugby above the existing North A and South A leagues.

The eight teams in the inaugural 2016–17 season were those who finished in the top four of the North A and South A leagues in the preceding 2015–16 season.

The league expanded to nine teams in the 2017–18 season and ten teams in the 2018–19 season.

Current clubs

* Excludes the 2020-21 season, which was cancelled due to Covid-19.

** Not to be confused with Hartpury University R.F.C., who play in the RFU Championship.

Season structure

The season has three phases:
 League - a double round-robin tournament, where teams play each other home and away.
 Championship - a knockout tournament featuring the top eight teams from the League.
 Playoff - a knockout tournament featuring the team at the bottom of the League and the teams at the top of North A and South A leagues. The Playoff determines whether relegation and promotion occur.

League
The League season currently has 18 rounds and typically runs from September to March. League points are awarded in the following way:

 4 points for winning a match
 2 points for drawing a match
 0 points for losing a match
 1 losing bonus point for losing by 7 points (or less)
 1 try bonus point for scoring (at least) 4 tries, regardless of the outcome.
In this points system winning teams get 4 or 5 points, drawing teams 2 or 3 points, and losing teams between 0 and 2 points.

Championship

The Championship competition has three rounds and typically takes place in late March and early April. It features the teams who finished in the top eight of the League. The Championship final takes place at Twickenham Stadium.

Playoff

The team that finishes last in the league is not automatically relegated. Relegation from (and promotion to) BUCS Super Rugby is decided through a playoff in the format of a three-team, single-elimination tournament.

The playoff begins with a Semi-final between the winners of the North A and South A leagues. The bottom placed BUCS Super Rugby team has a bye directly into the Final. The winner of the Final is the team that plays in the next season of BUCS Super Rugby.

Results

League and Championship

Green background (rows 1 to 8) are teams that progressed to the Championship tournament.
Red background is a team that was relegated after losing a playoff to a North A / South A team.
(CH) Champions. (RU) Runners-up. (SF) Losing semi-finalists. (R) Relegated*	No Championship tournament was held in 2020 because of the COVID-19 pandemic.

Promotion and relegation

Alumni with international caps
Inclusion criteria: Played in a senior international test after playing in BUCS Super Rugby

Place in the BUCS Rugby Union pyramid

BUCS Super Rugby is the top division of men's university rugby in Britain. It sits in the Premier tier of the BUCS Rugby Union pyramid, along with North A, North B, South A and South B.

Media coverage
Some BUCS Super Rugby matches are streamed live on the BUCS Sport YouTube channel and the England Rugby YouTube channel. In the 2018–19 season some matches were broadcast on FreeSports.

See also
Rugby union in England
Rugby union in Wales
British Universities and Colleges Sport
Varsity Rugby

References

Rugby football
University and college rugby union competitions
2016 establishments in the United Kingdom